The Erie Belle was a Great Lakes steam ship that exploded along the eastern shore of Lake Huron in 1883. The rusting remains of the ship's boiler lie on a beach south of Kincardine, Ontario.

Service history
Originally known as the Hector, the Erie Belle was built in 1862 in Cleveland, Ohio by Peck & Masters, serving as a tug in Lake Erie during the Civil War.  Following the war, she sailed for many years as a passenger and package freight steamer, serving the western end of Lake Erie, until sinking in the Detroit River in November 1873.  She was later raised and re-built, and in 1879 was sold to Daniel B. Odette of Windsor, who renamed her Erie Belle. Within a short period of time she was wrecked again, near Colchester, Ontario, following which she was repaired and once again returned to service, this time as a tug.

Demise
A two-week period beginning on 11 November 1883, saw several powerful storms hit the east shore of Lake Huron.  The schooner J. N. Carter was southward bound with a load of timber on November 15 when it overshot Kincardine harbour, and then blew ashore two miles south of the town as it attempted to turn and head north.  The Erie Belle was sent to rescue the Carter and arrived on the morning of the 21st.  Tow ropes were attached, but the Erie Belle initially was unable to move the stranded schooner.  While there are no reliable accounts of what caused the boiler to explode, a common theory is that the relief valve was wired shut in order to produce more steam, and as the engine over-heated and began to seize — further impeding the release of steam — the pressure reached the bursting point.  Four crewmen died in the ensuing explosion, while the remaining eight were blown overboard and rescued by the crew of the Carter.  The Carter was left to sit out the remainder of the winter, frozen in place, and was freed the following spring.  She continued service on the Great Lakes until eventually foundering in the Mississagi Strait in the late 1890s.

The boiler
Following the explosion, the remains of the ship were dragged closer to shore and disassembled, leaving the boiler about 20 metres offshore. An illegal attempt to salvage the boiler then pulled it to its current position close to the shoreline. Depending on the level of the lake from year to year, the boiler can be completely out of the water, or in shallow water within a metre of shore.

The largest visible part of the boiler is the outer casing of the fire box, the lower end of the boiler, which is oriented toward the south.  The boiler is resting on what was originally the side through which fuel would have been stoked into the firebox.  The base of the flue, which would have carried smoke and exhaust gasses to the ship's funnel, is now nearly buried in the sand and points to the north.  Between the flue and the firebox is a tangled, broken area that would have originally held steam tubes.

References

External links
 Photograph of Erie Belle as she appeared in 1879

1862 ships
Ships built in Cleveland
Steamships of the United States
Steamships of Canada
Shipwrecks of Lake Huron
Maritime incidents in November 1883
Ships sunk by non-combat internal explosions
Buildings and structures in Bruce County
Tugboats on the Great Lakes